Levine's sign is a clenched fist held over the chest to describe ischemic chest pain.

It is named for Samuel A. Levine (1891–1966), an influential American cardiologist, who first observed that many patients with chest pain made this same sign to describe their symptoms. This clenched fist signal may be seen in patients with acute coronary syndrome (myocardial infarction and angina pectoris).

A variant of this sign which uses the entire palm instead of the clenched fist over the chest is commonly known as the Palm Sign and in Latin America, it is widely referred to as the Cossio's Sign, Cossio-Levine Sign or even Fuchs-Levine Sign. The first two in reference of famous Argentine Cardiologist, Pedro Alurralde Cossio (1900-1986) who described it sometime in 1934. The latter in reference of famous Brazilian Cardiologist, Flávio Danni Fuchs (1950-), also attributed as having described the sign

References

Symptoms and signs: Cardiac